Buffalo Township is a township in Scott County, Iowa, USA.  As of the 2000 census, its population was 4,688.

Geography
According to the USGS, it contains four cemeteries: Asbury, Blue Grass, Rose Hill and Saint Peter's.

The streams of Dodges Creek, Donaldson Creek and Moore Creek run through this township.

Transportation
Buffalo Township contains one airport or landing strip, Village Oaks Landing Strip.

References
 USGS Geographic Names Information System (GNIS)

External links
 US-Counties.com
 City-Data.com

Townships in Scott County, Iowa
Townships in Iowa